Gael is a French language monthly women's and lifestyle magazine published monthly in Mechelen, Belgium. It has been in circulation since 1988.

History and profile
Gael was started in 1988. The magazine is part of Sanoma and is published by Sanoma Magazines Belgium, a subsidiary of the company, on a monthly basis. It has its headquarters in Mechelen. The former headquarters of the magazine was in Brussels.

Its target audience includes women aged 25 to 44. The monthly focuses on fashion- and beauty-related news as well as features articles on a wide range of topics, including travel, health, society, food and culture. The magazine offers a 24-page regional section, which provides region-specific news. It has a special fashion supplement published twice per year.

Anne-Sophie Kersten is the editor-in-chief of Gael.

The circulation of Gael was 75,000 copies in the period 2006-2007. It was 32,467 copies in 2012. The magazine sold 22,726 copies in 2014.

See also
 List of magazines in Belgium

References

External links
 

1988 establishments in Belgium
French-language magazines
Lifestyle magazines
Magazines established in 1988
Magazines published in Brussels
Mass media in Mechelen
Monthly magazines published in Belgium
Women's fashion magazines
Women's magazines published in Belgium